Roman Ablakimov (born 28 August 1987) is a Kyrgyzstani footballer who is a midfielder for Sunkar and the Kyrgyzstan national football team.

International goals

External links

1987 births
Living people
Kyrgyzstani footballers
Kyrgyzstan international footballers
Kyrgyzstani expatriate footballers
FC Alga Bishkek players
Footballers at the 2006 Asian Games
Footballers at the 2010 Asian Games
Association football midfielders
Asian Games competitors for Kyrgyzstan